Clara Louise Thompson (1884–?) was an American educator, Latinist, activist, feminist, and suffragette. She is the only woman to be awarded the American Fellowship at the American School of Classical Studies in Rome (now, American Academy in Rome).

Biography
Thompson grew up in Saint Louis, Missouri, along with a sister, Alice. She studied at Washington University in St. Louis  (Bachelor's degree, 1906), University of Pennsylvania (Master's degree, 1908), American School of Classical Studies (Fellowship; now American Academy in Rome), and University of Pennsylvania (Ph.D, 1911). She was active in the suffrage movement. She served as President of Latin at Rockford College (now Rockford University, and also taught at the University of Pennsylvania. She was the author of Seneca's Octavia as well as articles and other writings in various magazines. Thompson was affiliated with the Advisory Council of the Congressional Union for Woman Suffrage. She was a member of the Classical Association, American Classical League, and American Philosophical Association. She is the only woman to be awarded the American Fellowship at the American School of Classical Studies in Rome (now, American Academy in Rome).

Personal life
Thompson made her home in Rome, Georgia and Saint Louis, Missouri. She had a romantic relationship spanning decades with Jeannette Howard Foster, a librarian, professor, poet, and researcher.

References

Bibliography

1884 births
American feminists
American suffragists
Washington University in St. Louis alumni
University of Pennsylvania alumni
Rockford University faculty
University of Pennsylvania faculty
Lesbian feminists
People from St. Louis
American Latinists
Year of death missing
Members of the American Philosophical Society